Gongyi Xiqiao is a station on Line 4 and the Daxing Line of the Beijing Subway.

Station Layout 
The station has underground dual-island platforms.

Exits 
There are 5 exits, lettered A, B, C, D, and E. Exit B is accessible.

References

External links
 

Beijing Subway stations in Fengtai District
Railway stations in China opened in 2009